The Zululand dwarf chameleon (Bradypodion nemorale) is a species of lizard in the family Chamaeleonidae. It is also known as the Qudeni dwarf chameleon.
It is endemic to South Africa.

References

Sources

External links
 Search for Distribution of Bradypodion nemorale

Bradypodion
Reptiles of South Africa
Reptiles described in 1978
Taxonomy articles created by Polbot